USS Saetia (ID-2317) was a United States Navy cargo ship in commission in 1918 that was sunk during World War I.

Construction and commissioning
Saetia was laid down as the commercial steel-hulled cargo ship SS Colorado at Wilmington, Delaware, by Harlan and Hollingsworth for the Mallory Steamship Line. While she was under construction, the United States Shipping Board's Emergency Fleet Corporation requisitioned her. The U.S. Navy inspected her for possible World War I service on 8 February 1918 and earmarked her for service as a depot collier. After renaming her SS Saetia to avoid confusion with the battleship , then under construction, the Navy assigned her Identification No. 2317 and commissioned her as USS Saetia (ID-2317) on 1 March 1918 at Philadelphia, Pennsylvania.

Service history
Upon her commissioning, Saetia was assigned to the Naval Overseas Transportation Service (NOTS). Following a period of repairs that included the installation of her gun battery, Saetia took on a full load of supplies for the United States Army Quartermaster Corps and departed Philadelphia for New York City on 14 March 1918. At New York, she joined a convoy that departed for France on 16 March 1918. After the convoy arrived at Brest on 31 March 1918, Saetia steamed on to Rochefort, unloaded her cargo, and then joined a convoy for Philadelphia. Arriving at Phialdelphia in ballast on 3 May 1918, she underwent minor repairs and then moved to New York City join her second France-bound convoy, which got underway on 17 May 1918 and arrived at Quiberon to discharge cargo and load ballast on 1 June 1918. Saetia returned to Philadelphia on 2 July 1918 and, after repairs at Cramp Shipbuilding Company, during which she also loaded general cargo and ammunition, she steamed to New York on 15 July 1918. Joining a France-bound convoy on 24 July 1918, she delivered her goods at Gironde on 11 August 1918 and sailed for Philadelphia at the end of August 1918.

Saetia, with U.S. Army supplies in her holds, again joined a France-bound convoy at New York on 22 September 1918, bound for Brest. Arriving at Brest on 7 October 1918, she steamed on to Bordeaux, discharged her cargo, and then sailed for Philadelphia in ballast on 24 October 1918. She never reached Philadelphia. All hands survived, although 13 men suffered injuries. Sixty-six men abandoned ship in four lifeboats, and the other 19 took to two life rafts. The men in lifeboats landed at United States Coast Guard Station No. 146 at Ocean City, Maryland, while the steamship Kennebec picked up those in the life rafts and put them ashore safely at Cape May, New Jersey.

References 

Naval History and Heritage Command NH 105260 S.S. Saetia
NavSource Online: Section Patrol Craft Photo Archive: Saetia (ID 2317)

World War I cargo ships of the United States
Ships built by Harlan and Hollingsworth
Ships sunk by mines
1917 ships
Cargo ships of the United States Navy
World War I shipwrecks in the Atlantic Ocean
Shipwrecks of the Delaware coast
Maritime incidents in 1918